ABC News & Talk was a news/talk and entertainment radio channel programmed and distributed by ABC Radio Networks for satellite radio services. It aired on XM Satellite Radio channel 124, and Sirius Satellite Radio channel 143 both in the United States until September 24, 2007.

The channel also existed on Sirius Canada until February 2007. Each morning, the channel featured a six-hour news wheel, produced by ABC News Radio.  In the afternoon, hourly newscasts preceded some of ABC Radio's top talk show talent, like Sean Hannity, KABC's Larry Elder and WBAP's Mark Davis.

History
ABC News & Talk used to host a mid-day talk show exclusively for satellite radio titled Live from 125. The show's host was rotated on a weekly basis so there were several different program personalities. This show was discontinued in 2006.

In September 2006, John Batchelor took a leave of absence from the ABC Radio network. Mark Levin took his place on the ABC News & Talk lineup. Levin's show was broadcast on a 2-hour tape-delay basis, which was assumed to be twofold: to protect Elder's spot in the lineup, since Elder had the slot prior to Levin's arrival, and so Levin can continue to grow his terrestrial affiliate base.

The channel was programmed by ABC Radio until June 12, 2007, when it was turned over to Citadel Broadcasting as part of the divestiture by ABC parent Disney of nearly all of its radio assets. The network was shut down September 24, 2007.

Former on-air staff
 ABC Satellite News has ceased production, as it was produced exclusively for this channel.
 Sean Hannity, ABC Radio Networks' (Citadel/Cumulus Media Networks and now Westwood One's) most popular host, can be heard live, all three hours, weekdays on XM's America Right and Sirius' SIRIUS Patriot Channel 144.
 Mark Levin can also be heard live, for 3 hours, weekdays on America Right and SIRIUS Patriot.
 Bob Brinker can still be heard live weekends on XM's America Right, but will not be broadcast further on Sirius.
 Mark Davis' show has since been dropped from ABC Radio Networks, reverting to a local show on WBAP, and Davis has reestablished his national presence by becoming a substitute host for various shows, including The Rush Limbaugh Show. He is now heard on KSKY since 2012.
 While The Larry Elder Show is no longer airing on either satellite provider, he has returned to his regular local (Los Angeles) drive-time (3-6PM Pacific) time-slot on KABC. His show streams free over the internet during most live broadcasts, and is podcast for "Elderado" subscribers.
 The Satellite Sisters were not picked up by either service, and were dropped from ABC Radio Networks in October. Since then, their show is now an internet–based podcast.
 Peter Tilden will no longer be heard on either satellite provider. He was laid off by KABC in cost-cutting measures in February 2008, but was called back to work (replacing Doug McIntyre) in October 2009. This version of the show will strictly be local.
 John Batchelor returned to radio in 2008. As of 2009, he is heard on America's Talk on XM, though not yet on Sirius.

External links
 Citadel Media

Defunct radio networks in the United States
ABC Radio Networks
Digital-only radio stations
Radio stations established in 2002
Radio stations disestablished in 2007
Defunct radio stations in the United States
Former subsidiaries of The Walt Disney Company